The Vendor is a 2018 Nigerian nollywood comedy written, produced and directed by Odunlade Adekola, winner of the 2018 Africa Magic Viewers Choice Awards Best Actor in a Comedy. The official trailer for the movie was released in August 2018 whilst the movie got its cinema release on 7 September 2018, with a run time of 102 minutes. The film premiered on Netflix on 27 December 2019.

Plot
The film starred Odunlade Adekola as Gbadebo, a local newspaper vendor suffering from Entitlement syndrome. He is unsatisfied with his life and considers his present status and a lot of the people he interacts with daily to be less than him. He blames his lack of ambition and success that pervades his environment, but the reality is that he is a lazy man that prefers to spends his days complaining and putting down the honest efforts of those around him.

Gbadebo somehow lands a position as driver to Morayo,a young wealthy lady, played by Adunni Ade. However, his high level of indiscipline makes it impossible for him to work for long in this new job before getting into some serious trouble. 
However, he finally made it, when he met his wealthy biological father.

Cast
 Odunlade Adekola
 Adunni Ade
 Jide Kosoko
 Eniola Ajao
 Ireti Osayemi
 Kayode Olaseinde
 Tunde Bernard
 Bolaji Amusan

References 

2018 films
Nigerian comedy films